An International Wanderers team, made up of international players from multiple countries, toured Rhodesia in 1972. They played two matches against the Rhodesia cricket team.

Squad
The following players played one or more matches for the International Wanderers

Tour matches

References

1972 in Rhodesia
1972